Xu Garden, also called Xihuayuan is a classical Chinese garden in Xuanwu District, Nanjing, Jiangsu, China. It is located on the west side of the Presidential Palace in Nanjing. It is also one of two prominent gardens in Nanjing alongside the Zhan Garden.

History
Xu Garden was originally the garden of the residence of the "Prince of Han", a title held by Zhu Gaoxu (1280–1326), the second son of the Yongle Emperor of the Ming dynasty.

During the Qing dynasty, Xu Garden became the garden of the residence of the Viceroy of Liangjiang, who was in charge of Jiangsu, Jiangxi and Anhui provinces. The Kangxi Emperor visited Xu Garden five times during his six inspection tours to southern China between 1684-1702.

When the Taiping rebels occupied Nanjing and established the Taiping Heavenly Kingdom (1851–64), Xu Garden became the imperial garden of the Heavenly King's Palace and was called the "West Garden". The garden was destroyed in 1864 when Qing imperial forces recaptured Nanjing from the Taiping rebels. It was rebuilt in 1870 by the order of Zeng Guofan, who served as the Viceroy of Liangjiang from 1870–72.

In January 1912, when the provisional government of the Republic of China was set up in Nanjing, Xu Garden became the office and residence of the provisional president, Sun Yat-sen. The garden was used to house the offices of the National Revolutionary Army, Military Affairs Commission and Bureau of Investigation and Statistics after the government of the Republic of China was formally established in Nanjing in April 1927.

In 1982, Xu Garden, as part of the Former Location of the Heavenly King's Palace of the Taiping Heavenly Kingdom, was designated as a Major Historical and Cultural Site Protected at the National Level by the government of the People's Republic of China.

Features

Contained within Xu Garden is a 14.5-meter-long timber-mimic stony boat built by gray stones. Now it is the symbol of the garden. The Qianlong Emperor used to call it "Bu Ji Zhou", or "unmoored boat."

Xu Garden has an artificial hillock called "South Rockery," made of rocks resembling 12 Chinese zodiac animals. Among these hillock there is a Hexagonal Pavilion. From afar it looks like an overlapping of two pavilions, but a closer look reveals an integrated body. It was called "Mandarin Duck Pavilion," as mandarin ducks are known for appearing in pairs.

"Tong Yin Guan", or "Paulownia Melody House," is the largest building in the garden, built by paulownia timber. It was used as Zeng Guofan's reception hall. Several huge Chinese parasol trees are planted around the house. When rains fall on the trees, the mellifluous sounds resonate. Behind the house lies "North Rockery". There are caves inside the hillocks, and they are interconnected like a maze. Beside it is a stone tablet, on which the Daoguang Emperor's handwriting "Heart Stamping Stony House" is engraved.

See also
 List of Chinese gardens

References

External links

Gardens in China
Buildings and structures in Nanjing
Tourist attractions in Nanjing
Parks in Nanjing